Michaël Llodra and Fabrice Santoro were the defending champions, but had different outcomes. While Llodra did not compete this year, Santoro partnered with Nenad Zimonjić and reached the Quarterfinals, before losing to Jonas Björkman and Max Mirnyi.

Mark Knowles and Daniel Nestor won the title, defeating Jonathan Erlich and Andy Ram 6–4, 5–7, [13–11] in the final. It was the 4th title of the year for the pair, and the 43rd title for Knowles and 45th title for Nestor, in their respective careers.

Seeds
All seeds received a bye into the second round.

Draw

Finals

Top half

Bottom half

External links
 Main Draw

Italian Open - Doubles
Men's Doubles